Ministrymon leda, the leda ministreak, is a species of hairstreak in the butterfly family Lycaenidae. It is found in North America.\

References

Further reading

External links

 

Eumaeini
Articles created by Qbugbot
Butterflies described in 1882